Zemeros flegyas, the Punchinello, is a small butterfly found in South Asia and Southeast Asia that belongs to the family Riodinidae.

Subspecies
 Z. f. flegyas Assam, northern India, southern Yunnan
 Z. f. indicus Fruhstorfer, 1898 Yunnan
 Z. f. albipunctatus Butler, 1874 Peninsular Malaya, Singapore
 Z. f. allica (Fabricius, 1787) Burma, Thailand, Langkawi, Indo China
 Z. f. annamensis Fruhstorfer, 1912 Annam
 Z. f. sipora Riley Mentawai 
 Z. f. arimazes Fruhstorfer, 1912 Lombok
 Z. f. balinus Fruhstorfer, 1912 Bali
 Z. f. celebensis Fruhstorfer, 1899 central Sulawesi
 Z. f. confucius (Moore, 1878) Hainan
 Z. f. hostius Fruhstorfer, 1912 northern Borneo
 Z. f. javanus Moore, 1902 Java
 Z. f. phyliscus Fruhstorfer, 1912 Sumatra
 Z. f. retiarius Grose-Smith, 1895 Sumbawa 
 Z. f. sosiphanes Fruhstorfer, 1912 southern Sulawesi 
 Z. f. sparsus Fruhstorfer, 1898 Nias island
 Z. f. strigatus Pagenstecher Sumba
 Z. f. hondai Hayashi, 1976 Palawan

Description

Like many tropical butterflies they show different wet- and dry-season forms.

Wet-season form

Male upperside is vinaceous (colour of red wine) brown, the veins ochraceous brown. Forewings and hindwings crossed by four series of minute white spots, the postdiscal series very often obscure, each spot bordered inwardly by a more or less elongate black spot; a terminal very slender black line; cilia alternately black and white. Underside is bright ochraceous brown, the veins conspicuously paler, the white black-bordered spots as on the upperside but larger, more clearly defined and prominent. Antennae brown ringed with white; club black, ochraceous at apex; head, thorax and abdomen concolorous with the wings; beneath, the palpi, thorax and abdomen slightly paler than the wings.

Dry-season form

Male upperside has the ground colour darker than in the wet-season form; the spots are smaller and duller in colour. On the forewing the postdiscal series of spots often obsolescent except the spots in interspaces 3, 6 and 8, the latter two very large and prominent; sub-terminal series of spots also often obsolescent. The veins on both forewings and hindwings not paler than the ground colour. Underside is similar to the underside in the wet-season form, but the ground colour a shade darker; the veins not conspicuously paler; the white spots as in the wet-season form, except the postdiscal and subterminal series on the forewing, which are as on the upperside, the anterior large white spots of the postdiscal series being very prominent; the inner black bordering to the white spots much smaller than in the wet-season form. Antennae, head, thorax and abdomen as in the wet-season form.

Females have the upper and undersides similar to those of the wet-season form, but the ground colour brighter and paler; markings also similar, but the black bordering to the white spots less prominent.

Larva
 
Larva feeds on Maesa species (Maesa chisia, Maesa montana and Maesa indica).

Pupa

Cited references

Other references
 
 

Nemeobiinae
Butterflies of Asia
Butterflies of Indochina